Richard Brown, Jr. (born April 15, 1994) is an American football linebacker who is currently a free agent. He played college football for Mississippi State, leading the team in tackles as the starting middle linebacker in 2015 and 2016.

Professional career

Tampa Bay Buccaneers
Brown was signed by the Tampa Bay Buccaneers as an undrafted free agent on May 1, 2017. He was waived on September 2, 2017.

Carolina Panthers
On December 5, 2017, Brown was signed to the Carolina Panthers' practice squad. He signed a reserve/future contract with the Panthers on January 8, 2018.

On August 31, 2018, Brown was waived by the Panthers.

Atlanta Falcons
On September 25, 2018, Brown was signed to the Atlanta Falcons' practice squad. He was released on October 18, 2018.

On July 26, 2019, Brown was re-signed by the Falcons. He was waived/injured on August 31, 2019 and placed on injured reserve. He was released on December 20, 2019.

References

External links
Mississippi State Bulldogs bio

1994 births
Living people
People from Long Beach, Mississippi
Players of American football from Mississippi
American football linebackers
Mississippi State Bulldogs football players
Tampa Bay Buccaneers players
Carolina Panthers players
Atlanta Falcons players